Stag beetles are a family of about 1,200 species of beetles in the family Lucanidae, currently classified in four subfamilies.

Overview

The English name is derived from the large and distinctive mandibles found on the males of most species, which resemble the antlers of stags.

A well-known species in much of Europe is Lucanus cervus, referred to in some European countries (including the United Kingdom) as the stag beetle; it is the largest terrestrial insect in Europe. Pliny the Elder noted that Nigidius called the beetle lucanus after the Italian region of Lucania where they were used as amulets. The scientific name of Lucanus cervus adds cervus, deer.

Male stag beetles are known for their oversize mandibles used to wrestle each other for favoured mating sites in a way that parallels the way stags fight over females. Fights may also be over food, such as tree sap and decaying fruits. Despite their often fearsome appearance, they are not normally aggressive to humans. During a battle the main objective is to dislodge its opponent's tarsal claws with its mandible, thus disrupting their balance. Because its mandibles are capable of exceeding its own body size, stag beetles are generally inefficient runners, and typically fly from one location to another. 

Female stag beetles are usually smaller than the males, with smaller mandibles that are much more powerful than the males'. As larvae, females are distinguished by their cream-coloured, fat ovaries visible through the skin around two-thirds of the way down their back.

The larvae feed for several years on rotting wood, growing through three larval stages until eventually pupating inside a pupal cell constructed from surrounding wood pieces and soil particles. In the final larval stage, "L3", the surviving grubs of larger species, such as Prosopocoilus giraffa, may be the size of a human finger.

In England’s New Forest, it was once believed that the stag beetle, dubbed the “devil’s imp,” was sent to do some evil to the corn crops. The superstition led to stoning the insects on sight, as observed by a writer in the Notes and Queries. 
Along with rhinoceros beetles, stag beetles are often bought as pets in South Korea and Japan.

Evolution 
The oldest known fossil of the group is Juraesalus from the late Middle Jurassic (Callovian) Daohugou Beds of Inner Mongolia, China. While initially interpreted as a member of Aesalinae, it was later interpreted to be a basal member of the family.

Antler allometry
The Lucanidae have (male-only) antlers. Their size often varies among individuals. Such variation is termed a scaling relationship or static allometry. Environmental conditions of development affect antler size, but genetic factors are active.

References

External links

Flickr Images
Stag beetle info Research site containing much information on the stag beetle as well as information on current conservation schemes.
 Checklist of New World stag beetles with links to pages with additional information and images.

Asahinet Stag beetles on postage stamps and species illustrations.
Lucanes du Monde Image rich French blog
TOL 
The Lucanid (Stag) Beetles of the World Extra detailed specimen photobook 2009
UNL Generic Guide to New World Scarabs- Lucanidae,
UK Stag Beetle School Project A UK school project about Stag Beetles (collecting data on populations)